This article is about the particular significance of the year 1887 to Wales and its people.

Incumbents
Lord Lieutenant of Anglesey – Richard Davies 
Lord Lieutenant of Brecknockshire – Joseph Bailey, 1st Baron Glanusk
Lord Lieutenant of Caernarvonshire – John Ernest Greaves
Lord Lieutenant of Cardiganshire – Herbert Davies-Evans
Lord Lieutenant of Carmarthenshire – John Campbell, 2nd Earl Cawdor
Lord Lieutenant of Denbighshire – William Cornwallis-West    
Lord Lieutenant of Flintshire – Hugh Robert Hughes 
Lord Lieutenant of Glamorgan – Christopher Rice Mansel Talbot 
Lord Lieutenant of Merionethshire – Robert Davies Pryce 
Lord Lieutenant of Monmouthshire – Henry Somerset, 8th Duke of Beaufort
Lord Lieutenant of Montgomeryshire – Edward Herbert, 3rd Earl of Powis
Lord Lieutenant of Pembrokeshire – William Edwardes, 4th Baron Kensington
Lord Lieutenant of Radnorshire – Arthur Walsh, 2nd Baron Ormathwaite

Bishop of Bangor – James Colquhoun Campbell 
Bishop of Llandaff – Richard Lewis
Bishop of St Asaph – Joshua Hughes
Bishop of St Davids – Basil Jones

Archdruid of the National Eisteddfod of Wales – Clwydfardd

Events
18 February – 39 miners are killed in an accident at Standard Colliery, Ynyshir.
June – The Riot Act is read at Mochdre in the Vale of Clwyd at the height of a "Tithe War".
24 May – The new Cardiff Metropolitan Cathedral, designed by Pugin, is opened.
24 August – Roath Dock opened in Cardiff Docks; the first sod of Roath Park is dug.
1 November – The Helvetia wrecked off Worms Head, Rhossili (remains can still be seen at low tide).
The Turner House Gallery, Penarth, is built to house the art collection of Major James Pyke Thompson.
Opening of Wrexham School of Science and Art, predecessor of Wrexham Glyndŵr University.
Lewis Llewelyn Dillwyn and Stuart Rendel affirm the Welsh Liberal Party's support of Irish Home Rule.
Richard John Lloyd Price establishes a Welsh whisky distillery on his Rhiwlas estate at Frongoch.

Arts and literature

Awards
National Eisteddfod of Wales  – held at London
Chair – Robert Arthur Williams, "Y Frenhines Victoria"
Crown – John Cadfan Davies, "John Penry"

New books

English language
Amy Dillwyn – Jill and Jack
Daniel Silvan Evans – Dictionary of the Welsh Language (Geiriadur Cymraeg)

Welsh language
Owen Evans – Geiriau Olaf Iesu Grist
Thomas Levi – Crist a Gwroniaid y Byd Paganaidd
The Text of the Mabinogion and Other Welsh Tales from the Red Book of Hergest (edited by John Gwenogvryn Evans)

Music
John Thomas (Pencerdd Gwalia) – Cambria’s Homage to our Empress Queen

Sport
Football
Chirk win the Welsh Cup for the first time.
Knighton Town F.C. is founded.
Rugby union
Ammanford RFC, Caerphilly RFC, Mumbles RFC, Newport RFC, Pontyclun RFC and Taffs Well RFC are established.
Wales play their first international in Llanelli; though the original venue of Stradey Park is moved to a local cricket pitch due to a frozen pitch.

Births
13 January – Hedd Wyn, poet (died 1917)
27 February – James Dickson Innes, landscape painter (died 1914)
23 March – Percy Jones, Wales international rugby player (died 1969)
19 April – Bertrand Turnbull, Olympic hockey player (died 1943)
23 April – Len Trump, Wales international rugby player (died 1948)
13 July – Elizabeth Watkin-Jones, children's author (died 1966)
21 September – T. H. Parry-Williams, poet, author and academic (died 1975)
11 October – William Davies, national librarian (died 1952)
29 December – Jack Wetter, Wales international rugby union captain (died 1967)
date unknown
Bessie Jones, singer (died 1974)
Artie Moore, wireless operator (died 1949)

Deaths
25 January – Rowland Prichard, musician, 76
16 February – Richard Owen, preacher, 47
24 March – William Lucas Collins, priest and writer, 71
11 April – Samuel Bowen, Independent minister, 87
23 April – John Ceiriog Hughes, poet, 54
3 May – Robert John Hussey Vivian, infantry officer, illegitimate member of the Vivian family, 84/5
21 May – Horace Jones, English architect who designed Cardiff Town Hall
28 May – Dan Isaac Davies, educationist, 48
19 July – Lewis Edwards, educationist, 77
1 August – Hugh Cholmondeley, 2nd Baron Delamere, politician, 75
11 August – Sir Richard Green-Price, 1st Baronet, politician, 83
7 November – Joshua T. Owen, Welsh-born educator, politician, and soldier in the Union army during the American Civil War, 66

References 

Wales